Thomas Brooke was an English Anglican priest, most notably Dean of Chester  from 1721 until his death in 1732.

Allen was born in Staffordshire and educated at Emmanuel College, Cambridge. He was also concurrently the Archdeacon of Staffordshire.

Notes

1732 deaths
18th-century English Anglican priests
Deans of Chester
Alumni of Emmanuel College, Cambridge
Clergy from Staffordshire
Archdeacons of Stafford